Robert Willard "Bobby" Buntrock (August 4, 1952 – April 7, 1974) was an American child actor. Buntrock is best known for playing the character of Harold "Sport" Baxter on the 1960s sitcom Hazel.

Career
Buntrock was born in Denver, Colorado to Robert E. and Maxine Buntrock. He had two sisters, Stella and Deanne. When he was three, the family moved to Whittier, California, where neighbors urged Buntrock's parents to get their son into acting. After submitting Buntrock's picture to various agents, he was signed by  Marcella Belle Rinehart. When he was seven years old, Buntrock landed his first role, on an episode of Wagon Train. He also appeared in guest spots on Westinghouse Desilu Playhouse, Mister Ed, and The Donna Reed Show.

In 1961, Buntrock won the role of Harold "Sport" Baxter on the sitcom Hazel, starring Shirley Booth. The series aired for five seasons, first on NBC with Don DeFore and Whitney Blake in the role of Harold's parents, George and Dorothy Baxter. In the fifth and final season (1965-1966) shown on CBS, the series was retooled after DeFore and Blake were dismissed and Harold lived with his Uncle Steve Baxter (Ray Fulmer), Aunt Barbara (Lynn Borden), and cousin Susie (Julia Benjamin). During the run of Hazel, Buntrock was tutored on the set and attended Lake Marie Public School in Whittier when the show was on hiatus.

After Hazel ended its run in 1966, Buntrock appeared in two guest spots on The Virginian in 1967 after which he retired from acting.

Personal life and death
Buntrock moved with his family to Keystone, South Dakota, where he graduated from Sturgis High School in 1970, and lived for the last five years of his life. 

On April 7, 1974, Buntrock died at age 21 in an automobile accident when his car veered off a bridge under construction into Battle Creek, drowning him in the submerged car. He is buried in Keystone Cemetery in Keystone.

Filmography

References

External links

 
 

1952 births
1974 deaths
20th-century American male actors
Accidental deaths in South Dakota
Actors from Whittier, California
American male child actors
American male television actors
Burials in South Dakota
Male actors from Denver
Male actors from South Dakota
Road incident deaths in South Dakota